William Ick (1800 – 23 September 1844) was an English botanist and geologist.

Early life

Ick was born at Newport in Shropshire in 1800. In 1803 his family moved to Birmingham. His father was a dealer in skins and hides.

Education

He was awarded a Ph.D. in Geology from a German university.

Career

Ick was a tutor at a school near Warwick before becoming the first curator of the Birmingham Philosophical Institution.

Contribution to botany

In 1835 the United Committee of the Birmingham Botanical and Warwickshire Floral Societies offered a prize for the best herbarium of native plants collected within a 10 miles radius of central Birmingham between 1 August 1836 and 1 August 1837. Ick won this prize with a herbarium of around 320 pressed plants and published his findings. In 1948 Ick's herbarium was presented to Birmingham Museum and Art Gallery after being lost for over a century

References 

English botanists
19th-century British geologists
1800 births
1844 deaths
People from Newport, Shropshire
People from Birmingham, West Midlands